Thomas Hodges was the member of Parliament for Cricklade in the parliament of November 1640.

References 

Year of birth missing
Year of death missing
Members of the Parliament of England (pre-1707) for Cricklade
English MPs 1640–1648